Lilleborg is a ruined castle in the Almindingen forest in the centre of the Danish island of Bornholm. It is situated close to the main road from Rønne to Svaneke. Of the Danish fortresses built in the 12th century, Lilleborg most closely resembles those of Saxon architectural style.

History

The castle was probably built in the middle of the 12th century as a royal fortress. The move could be explained by the fact that in 1149, three-fourths of Bornholm had been surrendered to Eskil, archbishop of Lund. As a result, King Sweyn III wanted to establish his own seat of power on the remaining fourth of the island. While it could not be compared to the archbishop's Hammershus, Lilleborg was nevertheless a fine stronghold and appears to have been easier to defend than the much larger Gamleborg. There is evidence suggesting the fortress burnt down in 1259 when Prince Jaromar of Rügen stormed and destroyed the "king's stronghold" on Bornholm. However, coins minted after that date have been found, indicating it was inhabited after its storming.

Architecture
Lilleborg's construction inland rather than on the coast has been compared to that of Refshaleborg on Borgø in Maribo lake. It had a large tower,  square, protecting the entrance to the courtyard. The fortress is further protected by a curtain wall which follows the cliff tops around the oval plateau. When its defenses were obsolete, the fort's stones were re-purposed for other buildings. From 2006 to 2011, restoration work was carried out at Lilleborg.

Grounds
It was accessed via a wooden bridge on the south side of the hill which led to a steep path up to the fortress. Positioned away from the coast, as hill forts might be, Lilleborg was characterized as being suitable as a hiding place during sudden attacks, but not efficient for protecting the coastline.

References

Ruins in Denmark
Forts in Denmark
Castles in Denmark
Buildings and structures in Bornholm